Alberta Provincial Highway No. 24, commonly referred to as Highway 24, is a highway in southern Alberta, Canada, east of Calgary.

Route description

Highway 24 continues south for another  before it turns to the east.  later, it passes Carseland, after which Highway 817 branches north toward Strathmore while Highway 24 crosses the Bow River on its way south. Wyndham-Carseland Provincial Park is on the east side of this stretch of road.

When Highway 24 meets Highway 547 westbound, it turns east and passes the Hamlet of Mossleigh.

Future
Plans are being made for a new diamond interchange at the North end of Highway 24 near Cheadle and Highway 1, as part of the Highway 1 Realignment Project. The purpose of this project is to upgrade the adjacent section of Trans-Canada Highway to freeway status (with 4 lanes in either direction) and bypass the town of Strathmore. As part of this project, there is also the possibility of changes to the Highway name designation for Northern 16 km stretch of Highway 24. As part of the project Highway 817 could be re-designated as new section of Highway 24, therefore leaving the old section of Highway 24 renamed to Cheadle Road or simply Range Road 262. An official decision on the naming designation has yet to be made.

Major intersections 
From south to north:

References

External links 

Highway 1 Realignment & Highway 24 Interchange by Alberta Transportation.

024